Rutog may refer to:

Rutog County, county in Tibet
Rutog Town, town in Rutog County
Rutog Dzong, historical Rutog town